Jhon Mosquera may refer to:

Jhon Mosquera (footballer, born 1990), Colombian footballer
Jhon Mosquera (footballer, born 1992), Colombian footballer

See also
John Mosquera (born 1988), Colombian footballer